A hack watch is a mechanical watch whose movement offers a mechanism for stopping and setting the seconds hand of the watch, then restarting the watch the instant the time setting matches the time displayed by a reference timepiece.

Hack watches are used on ships for astronomical sights for navigation and to synchronize the actions of personnel who may not be in direct communication (for example, personnel engaged in a military mission).

For navigational purposes, the hack watch is synchronized with the ship's marine chronometer. The use of a hack watch makes it easier to take sights, as the chronometer is normally in a fixed position in a ship – below decks and suspended in gimbals to keep it level and protect it from the elements, while the hack watch is portable and can be carried on deck. Though not as accurate as the chronometer, the hack watch is accurate enough to be satisfactory over the relatively short time period between setting it from the chronometer and taking the sight.

For mission synchronization, several hack watches can be set alike, then set going at the same moment.

References

Nautical terminology